The Rt Rev  Samuel Morley was Bishop of Tinnevelly at the turn of the nineteenth and twentieth centuries.

He was born in 1841 and educated at Pembroke College, Cambridge. After curacies at Ilkeston and Sandgate, he emigrated to India as a  CMS missionary, eventually becoming Domestic Chaplain to the Bishop of Madras before his elevation to the episcopate in 1896. He retired in 1903 and died twenty years later on 6 November 1923.

Notes

1841 births
Alumni of Pembroke College, Cambridge
English Anglican missionaries
20th-century Anglican bishops in India
Anglican bishops of Tinnevelly
1923 deaths
Anglican missionaries in India